The 2021 Explore the Pocono Mountains 350 was a NASCAR Cup Series race held on June 27, 2021, at Pocono Raceway in Long Pond, Pennsylvania. Contested over 140 laps on the  triangular racecourse, it was the 19th race of the 2021 NASCAR Cup Series season.

Entry list 
 (R) denotes rookie driver.
 (i) denotes driver who are ineligible for series driver points.

Qualifying
Chris Buescher was awarded the pole for the race as determined by the top 20 from Saturday's finishing order inverted.

Starting Lineup

Race

Stage Results

Stage One
Laps: 30

Stage Two
Laps: 55

Final Stage Recap And Results

Before the final stage break at lap 74's pit stop it was discovered that Kyle Busch got stuck in 4th gear. During the stage break pit stop his team discovered he had lost his clutch so he was forced to leave it in 4th gear for the remainder of the race. With one lap before the restart he topped off on fuel, gambling that there would be no further caution flags to the end, however there was one final caution on lap 94 for debris with the final restart on lap 96. This led to a 44 lap green flag run. Kyle Busch was able to get enough good fuel milage to win the race, passing the leader, teammate Denny Hamlin who was coming to pit lane for fuel as they were about to take the white flag.

Stage Three
Laps: 55

Race statistics
 Lead changes: 12 among 10 different drivers
 Cautions/Laps: 4 for 15
 Red flags: 0
 Time of race: 2 hours, 26 minutes and 49 seconds
 Average speed:

Media

Television
NBC Sports covered the race on the television side. Rick Allen, Jeff Burton, Steve Letarte and Dale Earnhardt Jr. called the race from the broadcast booth. Dave Burns, Marty Snider and Kelli Stavast handled the pit road duties from pit lane. Jac Collinsworth handled the features from the track.

Radio
MRN had the radio call for the race which was also simulcast on Sirius XM NASCAR Radio. Alex Hayden and Jeff Striegle called the race in the booth when the field raced through the tri-oval. Dave Moody called the race from the Sunoco spotters stand outside turn 2 when the field raced through turns 1 and 2. Mike Bagley called the race from a platform inside the backstretch when the field raced down the backstretch. Kyle Rickey called the race from the Sunoco spotters stand outside turn 4 when the field raced through turns 3 and 4. Steve Post and Kim Coon worked pit road for the radio side.

Standings after the race

Drivers' Championship standings

Manufacturers' Championship standings

Note: Only the first 16 positions are included for the driver standings.
. – Driver has clinched a position in the NASCAR Cup Series playoffs.

References

Explore the Pocono Mountains 350
Explore the Pocono Mountains 350
Explore the Pocono Mountains 350
NASCAR races at Pocono Raceway